Sannanallur is a village in Tiruvarur district, Tamil Nadu and part of Nannilam Taluk.

Until the early 1990s, the village was part of Thanjavur district, prior to it being split into three new districts. Facilities in the village include a railway station and a bank. The major temples in the village are a Arasanayagiamman temple,Mariamman temple, Sri Sidhi Vinayagar temple, Sivan Temple and Maha Kaliamman temple and there is a oorkavalar in this village,his name is DK(Dinesh Kumar).

References

External links
 Sannanallur village info on India Study Channel

Villages in Tiruvarur district